Goodenia paniculata, commonly known as branched goodenia, is a species of plant in the family Goodeniaceae and is endemic to eastern Australia. It is a short-lived herb with egg-shaped to lance-shaped leaves with toothed edges and racemes of yellow flowers.

Description

Taxonomy
The name Goodenia paniculata first appeared in scientific literature in the Transactions of the Linnean Society of London in 1794, published by the English botanist, James Edward Smith from specimens collected by David Burton in Port Jackson.

Karel Domin described Goodenia rosulata from Queensland in 1929, but this name is now regarded as a synonym of G. paniculata by the Australian Plant Census.

The specific epithet paniculata refers to flower panicles. However, the flowers form on racemes not panicles.

Distribution and habitat
Branched goodenia grows in freshwater wetland or swampy habitat on clay, silty or sandy soils, often on the coast, and it has been known to grow in soils with pH as low as 2.5. It is found from Queensland through eastern New South Wales to south-eastern Victoria to as far west as Rosedale. In New South Wales in mainly occurs in coastal areas but also as far west as the Blue Mountains and Nerriga. The plant community it grows in is heath or woodland, dominated by such trees as thin-leaved stringybark (Eucalyptus eugenioides), broad-leaved red ironbark (E. fibrosa), forest red gum (E. tereticornis), woollybutt (E. longifolia) and white feather honeymyrtle (Melaleuca decora), and shrubs such as prickly-leaved paperbark (M. nodosa), Deane's paperbark (M. deanei), and tantoon (Leptospermum polygalifolium).

References

paniculata
Flora of New South Wales
Flora of Queensland
Flora of Victoria (Australia)
Asterales of Australia
Taxa named by James Edward Smith
Plants described in 1794